Jazz Recital (also released as Dizzy Gillespie and His Orchestra) is an album by the trumpeter Dizzy Gillespie, recorded in 1954 and 1955 and released on the Norgran label. It consists of quintet, sextet and jazz orchestra tracks.

Track listing
All compositions by Dizzy Gillespie and Buster Harding except as indicated
 "Sugar Hips" (Dizzy Gillespie, Wade Legge) - 5:16  
 "Hey Pete" (Gillespie, Buster Harding, Lester Peterson) - 5:07  
 "Money Honey" (Jesse Stone) - 2:30 
 "Blue Mood" - 3:29  
 "Rails" - 3:30  
 "Devil and the Flesh" - 3:21  
 "Rumbola" - 3:25  
 "Taking a Chance on Love" (Vernon Duke, Ted Fetter, John Latouche) - 3:26  
 "Play Me The Blues"  -  
 "(Seems Like) You Just Don't Care" (Kitty Noble, Rose Marie McCoy) -

Personnel
Dizzy Gillespie - trumpet, vocals
Hank Mobley - tenor saxophone (tracks 1-7)
Jimmy Cleveland - trombone (tracks 4-6 & 10)
Harry Edison (tracks 8 & 9), Taft Jordan (track 10), Ermit V. Perry (track 10), Ernie Royal (track 10) - trumpet (tracks 5-8)
Matthew Gee (track 10), Melba Liston (tracks 8 & 9), Jimmy Wilkins (track 10) - trombone
Gigi Grice (track 10), Hilton Jefferson (track 10), Willie Smith (tracks 8 & 9) - alto saxophone
Curtis Amy (tracks 8 & 9), Ed Beel (tracks 8 & 9), Ernie Wilkins (track 10), Budd Johnson (track 10) - tenor saxophone
Clyde Dunn (tracks 8 & 9), Sahib Shihab (track 10) - baritone saxophone
Wade Legge (tracks 1-7 & 10), Carl Perkins (tracks 8 & 9)  - piano 
George Bledsoe (tracks 8 & 9), Nelson Boyd (track 10), Lou Hackney (tracks 1-7)  - double bass
Al Bartee (tracks 8 & 9), Charlie Persip (tracks 1-7 & 10) - drums 
Toni Harper (tracks 8 & 9), Herb Lance (track 10) - vocals

References 

Dizzy Gillespie albums
1955 albums
Norgran Records albums
Albums produced by Norman Granz